Zhangshu is a county-level city in Jiangxi province, China.

Zhangshu may also refer to these places in Hunan province, China:
Zhangshu Township, a township in Hengyang County
Zhangshu, Yongxing County, a town in Yongxing County
Zhangshu, Xiangyin County, a town in Xiangyin County

See also
Zhang Shu (1925–1998), Chinese diplomat